Deborah Offner (born August 7, 1959) is an American actress, songwriter, playwright, and theatre director.

Life
Offner was born in New York City in 1959. Her father was Mortimer Offner, a photographer, screenwriter, and TV and theatre director. He wrote many of Katharine Hepburn's early films, but he was blacklisted. Her mother, Pauline, was a photography editor and worked for the first medical photography journal Scope. She went to Sarah Lawrence College and NYU School of the Arts, and after graduating she continued to work in theatre on and off Broadway. She has since appeared in Act One at the Lincoln Center, and in film and television on Orange Is the New Black and in the comedy Top Five.

She also appeared in several Jonathan Kaplan films and TV series, including Project X, Immediate Family, Unlawful Entry, Love Field, ER and Law & Order: Special Victims Unit.

Partial filmography

Mourning Becomes Electra (1974, TV Mini-Series) - Hazel
A Small Circle of Friends (1980) - Sarah
Ghost Story (1981) - Helen
Soup for One (1982) - Girl in Neon Bedroom
Streetwalkin' (1985) - Heather
Key Exchange (1985) - Chiropractor Woman
Project X (1987) - Carol Lee
Crossing Delancey (1988) - Karen
True Believer (1989) - Laura Gayley
Immediate Family (1989) - Kathy
Unlawful Entry (1992) - Penny, Karen's Friend
Love Field (1992) - Police Dispatcher (voice)
Women: Stories of Passion (1997-1999, TV Series) - Christina / Caroline
Girl (1998) - Cybil's Mom
ER (1998, TV Series) - ICU Nurse
Cruel Intentions (1999) - Mrs. Michalak
It's the Rage (1999) - Secretary
Cain Rose Up (1999) - Birdette Cain
The Attic Expeditions (2001) - Dr. Coffey's Secretary
Richard Roe (2001, Short) - Kathy
Ted Bundy (2002) - Beverly
The Guardian (2004, TV series) - Beth Jacobson
Six Feet Under (2005, TV series) - Dr. Melnick
CSI: Crime Scene Investigation (2005, TV Series) - Nosy Lady
The Naked Brothers Band: The Movie (2005) - Miss Offner
Medium (2007, TV Series) - Mrs. Ueberschaer
Unearthed (2007) - Tanya the waitress
Law & Order: Special Victims Unit (2007, TV Series) - Judge
Hindsight (2008) - Manager
Law & Order (2009, TV Series) - Judge Rachel Cates
Black Swan (2010) - Administrator Susie
Blue Bloods (2012-2016, TV Series) - Judge Katrina McCarthy
High Maintenance (2013, TV Series) - Miriam
Home (2014) - Sondra
Top Five (2014) - Wendy (uncredited)
The Boy Downstairs (2017) - Shannon
Shiva Baby (2020) - Ellie

References

External links
 

1951 births
American film actresses
American television actresses
American women dramatists and playwrights
Songwriters from New York (state)
Actresses from New York City
Living people
Musicians from New York City
Sarah Lawrence College alumni
Tisch School of the Arts alumni